The Glauconie argileuse is a geological formation in Europe whose strata date back to the Late Cretaceous. Dinosaur remains are among the fossils that have been recovered from the formation.

Vertebrate paleofauna

See also

 List of dinosaur-bearing rock formations

References

Upper Cretaceous Series of Europe
Santonian Stage